Renan Lavigne (born 1 November 1974 in Longjumeau) is a professional squash player from France.

Career statistics
Listed below.

PSA Titles (9)
All Results for Renan Lavigne in PSA World's Tour tournament

PSA Tour Finals (Runner-Up) (6)

External links
 PSA player profile
 

French male squash players
1974 births
Living people
Competitors at the 2009 World Games